Delevea is a genus of beetles in the family Torridincolidae, containing:

 Delevea bertrandi Reichardt, 1976
 Delevea namibensis Endrödy-Younga, 1997

References

Myxophaga genera